USS Olympia (SSN-717) is a  of the United States Navy. She is the 30th Los Angeles class nuclear powered fast attack submarine.

Etymology
Olympia is the second ship of the U.S. Navy to be named for Olympia, Washington.

History
The contract to build her was awarded to Newport News Shipbuilding and Dry Dock Company in Newport News, Virginia on 15 September 1977 and her keel was laid down on 31 March 1981. She was launched on 30 April 1983 sponsored by Mrs. Dorothy Williams, and commissioned on 17 November 1984.

Olympia was assigned to Submarine Squadron 7 (SUBRON SEVEN) and was homeported in Pearl Harbor, Hawaii.

In 1998, Olympia became the first Pacific-based submarine to pass through the Suez Canal in over 35 years.

O'Kane cribbage board
When  became inactive in August 2018, Olympia became the oldest commissioned attack submarine in active service in the Pacific Fleet. Keeping with a tradition that dates back to World War II, Richard O'Kane's cribbage board was transferred from Bremerton to Olympia's wardroom.

Inactivation and decommissioning
Olympia arrived in Bremerton, WA, on Thursday, October 31, 2019, for inactivation and decommissioning. She was officially placed in reserve status, inactivated but in commission on 6 August 2020 and decommissioned on 5 February 2021. Like all other recent U.S. submarines, the vessel will be recycled via the Navy's Ship-Submarine Recycling Program.

Awards

Navy Unit Commendation
Meritorious Unit Commendation
National Defense Service Medal with star
Global War on Terrorism Service Medal
Sea Service Deployment Ribbon

Engineering Excellence
Deck Seamanship Award
Silver Anchor Award
Battle "E"

References 

, as well as various press releases and news stories.

External links

 

Los Angeles-class submarines
Cold War submarines of the United States
Olympia, Washington
Nuclear submarines of the United States Navy
1983 ships
Submarines of the United States
Ships built in Newport News, Virginia